The 1876 Indiana gubernatorial election was held on October 10, 1876. Democratic nominee James D. Williams defeated Republican nominee Benjamin Harrison with 49.06% of the vote.

General election

Candidates
Major party candidates
James D. Williams, Democratic, U.S. Representative
Benjamin Harrison, Republican, lawyer and brevet brigadier general, USV
Godlove Stein Orth, Republican, U.S. Representative
James C. Denny, Republican, former Attorney General
Leonidas Sexton, Republican, Lieutenant Governor under Thomas A. Hendricks

Other candidates
Henry W. Harrington, Greenback

Results

References

1876
Indiana
Gubernatorial